Qodsian (also Romanized as Qodsīān) is a village in Naharjan Rural District, Mud District, Sarbisheh County, South Khorasan Province, Iran. At the 2006 census, its population was 32, in 12 families.

References 

Populated places in Sarbisheh County